Gregory J. Gagnon (born ) is a United States Space Force major general who serves as the deputy chief of space operations for the intelligence of the United States Space Force. He has served as director of intelligence for both the United States Space Command and Air Combat Command. A career intelligence and cyber officer, he has commanded the Texas Cryptologic Center and 67th Cyberspace Operations Group.

In September 2021, Gagnon was nominated for transfer from the United States Air Force into the Space Force. In October 2021, he transferred to the Space Force. In September 2022, he was nominated for promotion to major general.

Education
 1994 Bachelor of Arts, Economics, Saint Michael's College, Winooski, Vt.
 1999 Master of Science, Defense Analysis in Information Operations, Naval Postgraduate School, Monterey, Calif.
 2000 Squadron Officer School, Maxwell Air Force Base, Ala.
 2006 Air Command and Staff College, Maxwell AFB, Ala.
 2011 Master of National Security Strategy, National War College, Washington, D.C.
 2016 Enterprise Perspective Seminar, Alan L. Freed Associates, Capitol Hill Club, Washington, D.C.
 2021 Enterprise Leadership Program, The University of North Carolina at Chapel Hill, North Carolina

Assignments

 November 1994 – July 1995, Student, Intelligence Training, 316th Student Training Squadron, Goodfellow Air Force Base, Texas
 August 1995 – August 1996, Assistant Chief of Targets, 8th Operations Support Squadron, Kunsan Air Base, South Korea
 August 1996 – May 1998, Mission Operations Commander, 13th Intelligence Squadron, Beale AFB, Calif.
 June 1998 – December 1999, Student, Naval Postgraduate School, Monterey, Calif.
 January 2000 – March 2002, Instructor, Air Force Special Operations School, Hurlburt AFB, Fla.
 March 2002 – December 2003, Staff Officer, Headquarters Pacific Air Forces, Hickam AFB, Hawaii
 January 2004 – July 2005, Flight Commander, Intel Operations and Missile Operations Center, PACAF Air Intelligence Squadron, Hickam AFB, Hawaii
 July 2005 – June 2006, Student, Air Command and Staff College, Maxwell AFB, Ala.
 June 2006 – March 2008, Director of Operations, 607th AIS, Osan AB, South Korea
 March 2008 – July 2010, Commander, 94th Intelligence Squadron, Fort George G. Meade, Md.
 July 2010 – June 2011, Student, National War College, Fort Lesley J. McNair, Washington, D.C.
 August 2011 – July 2012, Commander, 495th Expeditionary Intelligence Squadron, Kandahar, Afghanistan
 August 2012 – July 2014, Division Chief, Analysis and Intelligence Plans, Strategic Joint Intelligence Operations Center, Offutt AFB, Neb.
 July 2014 – July 2016, Commander, 67 Cyberspace Operations Group, Joint Base San Antonio-Lackland, Texas
 July 2016 – July 2018, Director, Commander's Action Group, Headquarters Air Force Space Command, Peterson AFB, Colo.
 July 2018 – July 2019, Commander, National Security Agency in Texas, San Antonio
 July 2019 – September 2020, Director of Intelligence, Air Combat Command, Joint Base Langley-Eustis, Va.
 September 2020 – July 2022, Director of Intelligence, U.S. Space Command, Schriever AFB, Colo.
 July 2022 – present, Deputy Chief of Space Operations for Intelligence, United States Space Force, the Pentagon, Arlington, Va.

Awards and decorations 
Gagnon is the recipient of the following awards:

Dates of promotion

Writings

References 

Living people
Year of birth missing (living people)
Place of birth missing (living people)
United States Air Force generals
United States Space Force generals